A. cornutus may refer to:

 Aenictus cornutus, an ant species in the genus Aenictus
 Allococalodes cornutus, a jumping spider species
 Amphicerus cornutus, a beetle species
 Arkys cornutus, an orb-weaver spider species in the genus Arkys

See also
 Cornutus (disambiguation)